August Willads Bech (21 July 1815 - 28 May 1877) was a Danish landowner. He owned Valbygård at Slagelse and Borupgård at Borup. Valbygård is still owned by his descendants.

Early life and education
Bech was born on 21 July 1815 in Copenhagen, the son of merchant and ship-owner Jørgen Peter Bech (1782–1846) and Ellen Sophie Magdalene Meyer (1784–1846). He grew up in his father's house at Nybrogade 22 and later studied agriculture in Denmark and Mecklenburg. His elder brother was Edward Bech, the Danish Counsel in New York.

Career

In 1840, Bech purchased Fredsholm at Nakskov on Lolland.  In 1846, he purchased Valbygård at Slagelse for 500,000 Danish rigsdaler and then parted with Fredsholm the following year. He modernized the operations and converted many of the copyholds to freeholds. He also constructed a number of new buildings on the estate. In 1855, he also acquired nearby Brorupgård. The two estates had a combined area of more than 600 hectares and were mainly used for breeding of cattle. He operated a modern dairy on his estate. He was also a pioneer of cultivation of root crops. In 1856, he increased his holdings with the acquisitions of Moselund in Engesvang at Silkeborg. He planted forest on most of the estate.

Bech was from 1855 and until his death a member of Sorø County Council.

Personal life and legacy
Bech married  Kirstine Margrethe (Grethe) Rothe (7 June 1823 - 21 March 1886), a daughter of counter admiral  Carl Adolph Rothe (1767–1834) and Benedicte Ulfsparre de Tuxen (1790–1877), on 30 March 1842 in the Church of Holmen.

He died on 28 May 1877 at Engelsholm in Vejle. He is buried at Norup Cemetery.

Valbygaard was passed down to his eldest son Jørgen Peter Bech. His second eldest son Carl Bech purchased Engelsholm Castle at Vejle. His elfest daughter Benedichte married Ludvig Eduard Alexander Reventlow, Count of  Rudbjerggaard- The younger daughter Ellen Sophie Magdalene "Mimi" Bech married Knud Sehested, of Stamhuset Broholm on Funen.

Accolades
In 1850, Bech was created a Knight in the Order of the Dannebrog In 1864, he was awarded the Cross of Honour.

References

External links
 August Villads Bech ast geni.com
 August Villads Becj
 August Villads Bech

19th-century Danish landowners
1815 births
1877 deaths